Bennie Smith (October 5, 1933 in St. Louis, Missouri – September 10, 2006 in St. Louis, Missouri) was an American, St. Louis blues guitarist, considered to be one of the city's patriarchs of electric blues.

His sound was emblematic of a St. Louis blues music that he helped define in over half a century practicing his trade. His contributions to the genre in that city, from the early 1950s and almost until the day of his death, included mentor, performer, and recording artist.

Due to his significant contribution to blues music in St. Louis, in October 2003 he received a proclamation from mayor Francis Slay marking October 5, 2003 as 'Bennie Smith Day' in that city. The board of aldermen similarly honored Smith, recognizing him as the "Dean of St. Louis Electric Guitarists".  During the 2006 Big Muddy Blues Festival in St. Louis, Mayor Slay honored Bennie once again on September 2 of that year, declaring that day also be known as 'Bennie Smith Day' in St. Louis.

Career
Smith worked as a session musician on many recordings over the years, and has three original albums to his name: The Urban Soul of Bennie Smith (Blues Highway - 1993), Shook Up (Fedora Records - 2001)), and The Bennie Smith All Star Session (2006). In a notable 1958 session, Smith was invited to contribute on what would be Tina Turner's  first recording, "Boxtop". The song featured Ike Turner with 'Little Ann' on backing vocals, and Smith on guitar.  In addition, he has played with such guitar players as Hubert Sumlin, Clarence "Gatemouth" Brown, B.B. King and Grant Green.

Discography

Albums
The Urban Soul of Bennie Smith 1993 (Blues Highway Music)
Shook Up 2001 (Fedora Records)
Bennie Smith All-Star Sessions 2006

In addition to his featured albums, Smith provided lead and rhythm guitar on a number of released singles and albums.  These included:

Sessions - singles
"Boxtop", Ike Turner, (with Tina Turner (a.k.a. Little Ann) on vocals) 1958 (Tune Town)
"Mistreated", Clayton Love with the Roosevelt Marks Orchestra, 1958-59 (Bobbin). It is likely that Smith recorded other songs with the Roosevelt Marks Orchestra during the period from 1958 to 1961.
"Condition Your Heart", Little Herbert and the Arabians, 1961
"Shook Up Over You", Jimmy "Soul" Clark, 1963

Sessions - albums
Mean Disposition, Big Bad Smitty, 1991 (Adelphi/Genes.  This album is included in the Library of Congress) - 
Cold Blood, Big Bad Smitty, 1997 (HMG) Smith shared the lead guitar role with Hubert Sumlin.

Style
Smith named Clarence "Gatemouth" Brown and Matt "Guitar" Murphy as his two greatest influences on the guitar.

Death
As a complication to lung cancer, Smith suffered a heart attack at his home on September 9, 2006.  He died on September 10, 2006.

References

External links
BluesWorld - Bennie Smith - Partial biography (missing the years after around 1995-1996)
Interview with Smith 
An article on St. Louis blues musicians featuring Smith Going Down Slow - Riverfront Times
Newspaper Article - Riverfront Times - A St. Louis Newspaper
Best Blues in St. Louis 2005 - Riverfront Times Readers Poll
Best Blues in St. Louis 2004 - Riverfront Times Readers Poll - Mention of Mayor's Proclamation in his honour
2005 Big Muddy Blues Festival - Showing Bennie and Henry Townsend together and listed as St. Louis Patriarchs of Blues
Folk Life - Library of Congress - American Folk Music and Folklore Recordings: A Selected List 1992 (Entry on Big Bad Smitty with mention of Bennie Smith)
BluesWorld - Big Bad Smitty - Mention of Bennie Smith
Blues Bytes review of Bennie's Album 'Shook Up
Obituary (St. Louis Post Dispatch) - Bennie Smith: Regarded as dean of electric blues guitarists
National Public Radio show (U.S.A.) - "Whaddya Know? (Not Much)" (Real Media) - October 11, 2003, Short Interview, Performance, 2 Songs: Wish You Well, Drown In My Own Tears
Best Blues in St. Louis 2006 Riverfront Times Readers Poll - References to his death and mention of Mayor's second Proclamation in his honour
Blue Sunday Riverfront Times article/obituary by Malcolm Gay (staff writer)

1933 births
2006 deaths
African-American guitarists
American blues guitarists
American male guitarists
Musicians from St. Louis
Music of St. Louis
St. Louis blues musicians
Deaths from lung cancer in Missouri
20th-century American guitarists
Guitarists from Missouri
20th-century American male musicians
20th-century African-American musicians
21st-century African-American people